This is a list of listed buildings in Perth and Kinross. The list is split out by parish.

 List of listed buildings in Aberdalgie, Perth and Kinross
 List of listed buildings in Aberfeldy, Perth and Kinross
 List of listed buildings in Abernethy, Perth and Kinross
 List of listed buildings in Abernyte, Perth and Kinross
 List of listed buildings in Alyth, Perth and Kinross
 List of listed buildings in Ardoch, Perth and Kinross
 List of listed buildings in Arngask, Perth and Kinross
 List of listed buildings in Auchterarder, Perth and Kinross
 List of listed buildings in Auchtergaven, Perth and Kinross
 List of listed buildings in Bendochy, Perth and Kinross
 List of listed buildings in Blackford, Perth and Kinross
 List of listed buildings in Blair Atholl, Perth and Kinross
 List of listed buildings in Blairgowrie And Rattray, Perth and Kinross
 List of listed buildings in Blairgowrie, Perth and Kinross
 List of listed buildings in Caputh, Perth and Kinross
 List of listed buildings in Cargill, Perth and Kinross
 List of listed buildings in Cleish, Perth and Kinross
 List of listed buildings in Clunie, Perth and Kinross
 List of listed buildings in Collace, Perth and Kinross
 List of listed buildings in Comrie, Perth and Kinross
 List of listed buildings in Coupar Angus, Perth and Kinross
 List of listed buildings in Crieff, Perth and Kinross
 List of listed buildings in Dron, Perth and Kinross
 List of listed buildings in Dull, Perth and Kinross
 List of listed buildings in Dunbarney, Perth and Kinross
 List of listed buildings in Dunkeld And Dowally, Perth and Kinross
 List of listed buildings in Dunning, Perth and Kinross
 List of listed buildings in Errol, Perth and Kinross
 List of listed buildings in Findo Gask, Perth and Kinross
 List of listed buildings in Forgandenny, Perth and Kinross
 List of listed buildings in Forteviot, Perth and Kinross
 List of listed buildings in Fortingall, Perth and Kinross
 List of listed buildings in Fossoway, Perth and Kinross
 List of listed buildings in Fowlis Wester, Perth and Kinross
 List of listed buildings in Glendevon, Perth and Kinross
 List of listed buildings in Inchture, Perth and Kinross
 List of listed buildings in Kenmore, Perth and Kinross
 List of listed buildings in Kettins, Perth and Kinross
 List of listed buildings in Kilspindie, Perth and Kinross
 List of listed buildings in Kinclaven, Perth and Kinross
 List of listed buildings in Kinfauns, Perth and Kinross
 List of listed buildings in Kinloch, Perth and Kinross
 List of listed buildings in Kinnaird, Perth and Kinross
 List of listed buildings in Kinnoull, Perth and Kinross
 List of listed buildings in Kinross, Perth and Kinross
 List of listed buildings in Kirkmichael, Perth and Kinross
 List of listed buildings in Lethendy, Perth and Kinross
 List of listed buildings in Liff And Benvie, Perth and Kinross
 List of listed buildings in Little Dunkeld, Perth and Kinross
 List of listed buildings in Logiealmond, Perth and Kinross
 List of listed buildings in Logierait, Perth and Kinross
 List of listed buildings in Longforgan, Perth and Kinross
 List of listed buildings in Madderty, Perth and Kinross
 List of listed buildings in Meigle, Perth and Kinross
 List of listed buildings in Methven, Perth and Kinross
 List of listed buildings in Moneydie, Perth and Kinross
 List of listed buildings in Monzievaird And Strowan, Perth and Kinross
 List of listed buildings in Moulin, Perth and Kinross
 List of listed buildings in Muckhart, Perth and Kinross
 List of listed buildings in Muthill, Perth and Kinross
 List of listed buildings in Orwell, Perth and Kinross
 List of listed buildings in Perth, Perth and Kinross
 List of listed buildings in Pitlochry, Perth and Kinross
 List of listed buildings in Portmoak, Perth and Kinross
 List of listed buildings in Rattray, Perth and Kinross
 List of listed buildings in Redgorton, Perth and Kinross
 List of listed buildings in Rhynd, Perth and Kinross
 List of listed buildings in Scone, Perth and Kinross
 List of listed buildings in St Madoes, Perth and Kinross
 List of listed buildings in St Martins, Perth and Kinross
 List of listed buildings in Tibbermore, Perth and Kinross
 List of listed buildings in Trinity Gask, Perth and Kinross
 List of listed buildings in Weem, Perth and Kinross

Perth and Kinross